Hetlingen is a municipality in the district of Pinneberg in the German state of Schleswig-Holstein.
Hetlingen is the site of Elbe Crossing 1 and Elbe Crossing 2, two power line crossings across the river Elbe. The pylons of Elbe Crossing 2 are the highest pylons in Europe. Hetlingen also has the largest sewage treatment in the state of Schleswig-Holstein, treating the wastewater of several districts with a total population of about 450,000.

References

Pinneberg (district)